Pääsküla (Estonian for "Passage Village") is a subdistrict in the district of Nõmme, Tallinn, the capital of Estonia.

Pääsküla has a station on the Elron western route.

Gallery

See also
Pääsküla River

References

Subdistricts of Tallinn